Eucalyptus opimiflora, commonly known as northern silver mallee, is a species of mallee that is endemic to near-coastal areas of Western Australia between Perth and Geraldton. It has smooth grey bark, lance-shaped adult leaves, flower buds in groups of between seven and fifteen, creamy white flowers and conical to hemispherical fruit.

Description
The bark is smooth grey and cream-coloured.

Taxonomy and naming
Eucalyptus opimiflora was first formally described in 2012 by Dean Nicolle and Malcolm E. French from a specimen they collected near Badgingarra in 2000. The description was published in the journal Nuytsia. The specific epithet (opimiflora) is from Latin, meaning "rich" or "fruitful" (in the sense of fat) and "-flowered".

Distribution and habitat
This mallee usually grows on laterite slopes, often in low heath and occurs in near-coastal areas from south of Geraldton to near Cunderdin, in the Avon Wheatbelt, Geraldton Sandplains and Swan Coastal Plain biogeographic regions.

Conservation status
Eucalyptus opimiflora is classified as "not threatened" by the Western Australian Government Department of Parks and Wildlife.

See also
List of Eucalyptus species

References

opimiflora
Endemic flora of Western Australia
Myrtales of Australia
Eucalypts of Western Australia
Plants described in 2012